The Redback on the Toilet Seat is the debut studio album by Slim Newton released in November 1972.

Track listing
Side one
1. "The Redback on the Toilet Seat" (Newton) – 2:18 
2. "It Shouldn't Happen to a Dog" (Newton) – 2:35 
3. "Don't Point the Finger at Me" (Newton) – 2:03
4. "She Wouldn't Let Me Sleep" (Newton) – 2:00 
5. "You Can Say That Again" (Newton) – 3:06
6. "Hijacked" (Newton) – 1:36

Side two
1. "This Here Song" (Newton) – 2:35
2. "It's No Use Complaining" (Newton) – 2:46
3. "Hound Dog" (Newton) – 3:08
4. "I'm Desperate" (Newton) – 1:54 
5. "You Can't Win" (Newton) – 2:07
6. "You're Just Pint Sized" (Newton) – 2:37

Credits
Newton - vocals, rhythm guitar
Garry Brown - electric guitar (except "This Here Song")
Eric Newton - electric guitar (on "This Here Song")
Frank Jones - bass guitar
Goeff Cuneo - drums
Ian Fenton - cover illustration

References

External Links
 

1972 albums
Slim Newton albums